Paula Strautmane (born March 23, 1997) is a Latvian basketball player for TTT Riga and the Latvian national team. She played college basketball for the Quinnipiac Bobcats in Hamden, Connecticut. Her younger sister Digna also is a basketball player, who played at the Syracuse and Georgia Tech in NCAA and Latvian national team.

She participated at the EuroBasket Women two times (2017 and 2019).

References

1997 births
Living people
Latvian women's basketball players
Latvian expatriate basketball people in Spain
Basketball players from Riga
Power forwards (basketball)
Latvian expatriate basketball people in the United States
Quinnipiac University alumni